Dust from Underground is a Canadian drama film, directed by Arthur Lamothe and released in 1968. Adapted from the novel by André Langevin, the film stars Michelle Rossignol as Madeleine Dubois, a woman who begins to have an extramarital affair when her husband Alain (Guy Sanche) is too busy at work to devote any time and attention to their relationship.

The cast also included Henri Norbert, Nicole Filion, Gilles Pelletier, Nicolas Doclin, Roland Chenail, Victor Désy, Paul Guèvremont, Pierre Dupuis, Rose-Rey Duzil, Réjeanne Desrameaux and Louisette Dussault.

The film was shot in Thetford Mines, Quebec, in 1965, but was not released theatrically until 1968. In addition to screening commercially in Quebec, the film was screened at the 18th Berlin Film Festival in 1968 as part of Young Canadian Film, a lineup of films by emerging Canadian filmmakers.

References

External links
 

1968 films
1968 drama films
Canadian drama films
Films directed by Arthur Lamothe
Films based on Canadian novels
1960s French-language films
French-language Canadian films
1960s Canadian films